Ocoee() is an unincorporated community in Polk County, Tennessee, United States and named after the Cherokee settlement located in the area. It has a post office with the ZIP code 37361.

Geography
Its elevation is 797 feet (243 m), and it is located at  (35.1245194, -84.7181327). Ocoee is located at the intersection of US 64/US 74 and US 411.

Economy
Ocoee's economy is fueled by the Cherokee National Forest and the Ocoee River, which is known for its whitewater rafting. The upper section of the Ocoee was home to the 1996 Olympics slalom racing event.

Ocoee has a McDonald's, a Dollar General Store, a Hardee's, a Huddle House, grocery store, a bank and the Whitewater Inn.

On November 30, 2016, an EF3 tornado touched down in Ocoee, causing two deaths and severe damage to the post office, the volunteer fire department and a shop.

References

Unincorporated communities in Polk County, Tennessee
Unincorporated communities in Tennessee